The white-edged nudibranch, Fjordia capensis, is a species of sea slug, specifically an aeolid nudibranch, a very colourful sea slug. It is a marine gastropod mollusc in the family Flabellinidae.

Distribution
This species is endemic to the South African coast and is found only from the Atlantic coast of the Cape Peninsula to Port Elizabeth in 10–30 m of water.

Description
The white-edged nudibranch is a slender pale-bodied aeolid with numerous dark red cerata all edged with white. It is usually smaller than 40mm. It has rugose pale rhinophores. It has a pair of elongated oral tentacles having an opaque white stripe.

Ecology
This aeolid feeds on hydroids of the genus Eudendrium. In common with other aeolid nudibranchs, the cerata of white-edged nudibranch aid in respiration but also contain extensions of the digestive system. The white-edged nudibranch eats the hydroid and passes its nematocysts unharmed through its digestive system to the tips of its cerata. Here the nematocysts mature and are then used by the nudibranch for its own defence. It is probable that the bright colours of the white-edged nudibranch serve to advertise to predators that it is toxic.

The white-edged nudibranch is hermaphrodite. The egg mass is highly convoluted and creamy white.

References

  Thiele J., 1925. Gastropoden der Deutschen Tiefsee-Expedition. In:. Wissenschaftliche Ergebnisse der Deutschen Tiefsee-Expedition auf dem Dampfer “Valdivia” 1898-1899  II. Teil, vol. 17, No. 2, Gustav Fischer, Berlin

Flabellinidae
Gastropods described in 1925